The MATA Trolley is a heritage streetcar transit system operating in Memphis, Tennessee. It began operating on April 29, 1993. Service was suspended in June 2014, following fires on two cars. After nearly four years and repeated postponements, the reopening of the Main Street Line took place on April 30, 2018. The system's two other lines remained suspended as of December 2022, but with reopening of both planned.

The last line of Memphis’ original streetcar network closed on June 15, 1947.

Since opening the system has been extended twice and by 2004 consisted of three lines, operated by the Memphis Area Transit Authority (MATA). These lines are the Main Street Line, the Riverfront Loop and the Madison Avenue Line; however, service on the last two lines remains indefinitely suspended in December 2022. In the 2011–12 fiscal year, 1.34 million trips were made on the system, a 23.1% year-on-year growth the highest of any light rail system in the contiguous United States.

History 

After multiple delays, construction of the line commenced in February 1991 for completion by December 1992. However, due to the longer-than-anticipated restoration of the vintage streetcars, the opening of the line was delayed until spring 1993. After further delay, testing of the first of the restored cars began on March 10, 1993, and the system opened to the public on April 29, 1993.

On October 1, 1997, the Riverfront line opened. It was completed at a cost of about $56 million, which was approximately 25 percent below the original budget forecast for the project. The Main Street Line was extended to Memphis Central Station in February 2021.

On November 3, 2021, MATA announced a plan to test a modern streetcar from San Diego on the Madison Avenue Line, on which rail service has been suspended since 2014. The vehicle is light rail car 1035 from the San Diego Trolley light rail system. MATA acquired the 1988-built Siemens–Duewag U2 from San Diego in fall 2020, and the car arrived in Memphis in April 2021.

Rolling stock 

The trolleys used are almost all restored, vintage streetcars. The original three cars in operation on opening day were all formerly used in Porto, Portugal, and are Car 187, circa 1927; Car 194, circa 1935; and Car 204, circa 1940.
 wide and weigh  without passengers. The cars were restored by Kerns-Wilcheck Associates of Memphis. Three additional ex-Porto cars  (156, 164 and 180) joined them within weeks, and the fleet had six cars (all ex-Porto single-truckers) by May 1993.

Between the mid-1990s and 2003, the fleet expanded considerably in both number and capacity with the arrival of ten reconditioned Melbourne, Australia W2-class cars, all but one (Car 417) supplied by Gomaco Trolley Company. Other additions were single-truck Car 1979 that was built new by Gomaco in 1993, as a demonstrator; double-truck Car 1794 that was originally an open-sided car from Rio de Janeiro, Brazil, but was heavily rebuilt and enclosed before entering service in Memphis, and, in early 2004, a replica Birney Safety Car – again, manufactured by Gomaco, similar to those used on the TECO Line Streetcar in Tampa, Florida, and the Metro Streetcar in Little Rock, Arkansas.

The fleet and overhead wires were converted from trolley pole to pantograph current collection in early 2003, during a three-month suspension of service which started on January 5, 2003.

An eleventh reconditioned Melbourne car, W5-class 799, was purchased in 2006 by MATA with a view toward eventual restarting of trolley service.

In late 2020, MATA acquired three more Gomaco-built replica Birney streetcars, secondhand from the Charlotte Area Transit System, which had used them from 2004 to 2019 on its Charlotte Trolley System and CityLynx Gold Line. After a planned refurbishment, they are projected to enter service by late 2022.

In 2021, MATA acquired one secondhand Siemens-Duewag U2 LRV from San Diego Trolley to be used for testing on the Madison Avenue Line. The vehicle began testing on the line in March 2022.

Lines 
The MATA Trolley network consists of three lines. There are stations at 24 locations (inbound and outbound stations are counted as a single location), and 35 of the stations are sheltered and ADA-accessible.

Accidents and incidents 
On June 1, 2011, two trolleysa Melbourne W2-class and Porto number 194traveling on Main Street collided due to a power failure.

Two of the Melbourne cars caught fire, in December 2013 and April 2014. Both incidents occurred along the Madison Avenue line. In May 2014, the line was shut down in order to conduct an investigation, since the speeds along it are higher. On June 10, the suspension was expanded to include all MATA trolley lines after it was determined that much of the fleet would need to be renovated. At that time, the suspension was expected to last at least six months until a feasible solution could be found. Options included restoring the existing fleet at a cost of $6 million, or replacing them with new heritage streetcars at a cost of $40 million.  After thorough inspection of the fleet, MATA decided to overhaul several cars rather than purchase new ones, and to eventually reinstate service using only overhauled cars.  In December 2014, MATA announced that it was not yet able to give an estimated date for the resumption of service. In March 2015, it was announced that limited trolley service might be possible in May or June, but there was still no timetable for full restoration of service. In October 2016, Memphis Mayor Jim Strickland said trolleys would not be back in service before 2017.

Reopening 
Service on the Main Street Line restarted April 30, 2018. At that time, the other two lines were forecast to reopen within two years, but as of December 2022 they both remained indefinitely suspended (routes served by buses). In September 2021, MATA was predicting that the Riverfront Loop would reopen when three used Birney-replica cars acquired from Memphis in late 2020 were ready to enter service, which at the time was forecast for circa late 2022. Service on the Madison Avenue Line is planned to be restored sometime after 2022 after the testing of the Siemens-Duewag U2 LRV on the line is completed and more vehicles are purchased.

See also 
 Memphis Area Transit Authority
 Memphis Suspension Railway
 Memphis Street Railway Company
 List of heritage railroads in the United States
 List of rail transit systems in the United States
 Streetcars in North America

References

External links 

MATA: Trolley Lines
A Coordinated Human Services Transportation Plan for the Memphis Area – MATA
Heritagetrolley.org page on Memphis (APTA)
Railwaypreservation.com page on Memphis (with many photos)
Memphis Main Street Trolley (page by Jon Bell)
Map

Heritage railroads in Tennessee
Heritage streetcar systems
Trolley
Streetcars in Tennessee
Electric railways in Tennessee
1993 establishments in Tennessee
600 V DC railway electrification
Railway lines opened in 1993